The Russian River (Southern Pomo: Ashokawna) is a southward-flowing river that drains  of Sonoma and Mendocino counties in Northern California.

Names

The Southern Pomo know the river as Ashokawna (ʼaš:oʼkʰawna), "east water place" or "water to the east," and as Bidapte, "big river." Juan Rodríguez Cabrillo and his expedition may have travelled as far north as the Russian River in November 1542 before storms forced them to turn back south towards Monterey. The earliest Slavic name for the river, Slavyanka, appears on a Russian-American Company chart dated 1817. In 1827 the Spanish called it the San Ygnacio, and in 1843 the Spanish land grant referred to it as Rio Grande.

The Russians called it the Slavyanka River, meaning "Slav River." (Slavyanka in Russian means "Slavic woman".) They established three ranches near Fort Ross, one of which, the Kostromitinov Ranch, stretched along the Russian River near the mouth of Willow Creek. The redwoods that lined its banks drew loggers to the river in the late-19th century.

According to the USGS, variant names of the Russian River include Misallaako, Rio Ruso, Shabaikai, and Slavyanka.

Course

It flows generally southward to Redwood Valley, then past Calpella, where it is bordered by U.S. Route 101, to join the East Fork Russian River just below Lake Mendocino.

From there the Russian River flows south, past Ukiah through the Ukiah Valley and Hopland through the Sanel Valley, and crosses into Sonoma County just north of Cloverdale. Closely paralleled by U.S. Route 101, it descends into the Alexander Valley, where it is joined by Big Sulphur Creek. It flows south past Cloverdale, Asti, and Geyserville.

East of Healdsburg, Maacama Creek joins the Russian River. After it makes a series of sweeping bends, the Healdsburg Memorial Bridge carries Old Redwood Highway over the river just upstream of U.S. Route 101's Healdsburg crossing. It receives water from Lake Sonoma via Dry Creek. The river turns westward, where it is spanned by the Wohler Bridge, and it is joined by Mark West Creek north of Forestville, followed by Green Valley Creek to the south. The river passes Rio Nido and Guerneville. In that area, State Route 116 parallels the river, bordering it past Guernewood Park and Monte Rio.

Austin Creek enters from the north before the River passes through Duncans Mills. State Route 1 crosses over the river before it flows into the Pacific Ocean between Jenner and Goat Rock Beach. The Russian River estuary is recognized for protection by the California Bays and Estuaries Policy.

The lower Russian River is a popular spring, summer, and fall destination for navigation and recreation. It is very safe at that time for swimming and boating, with a gentle current. The river is dangerous in the winter, with swift current and muddy water.

Geology
The geographer R. S. Holway wrote of the Russian River in his 1917 paper "The Russian River: A Characteristic Stream of the California Coast Ranges".
Originally, the Russian River was one of several rivers draining westward from the Mayacamas Mountains through the Mendocino Plateau to the sea, a region lifted up by tectonic forces. The Navarro River drained from the Cobb Mountain area, while the Russian River drained from the Mt. St. Helena area. Being at a lower elevation, the Russian River began cutting north into the drainage area of the Navarro River. Eroding up a fault line in Alexander Valley, the Russian River intersected the Navarro River just north of Cloverdale. This resulted in the stream capture of Big Sulphur Creek (formerly the upper Navarro River) and the north fork of the Navarro River, going north to Hopland and to Ukiah. The high valleys were eroded into rocky canyons for ten miles north of Cloverdale and for five miles east of Cloverdale.

After establishing a connection to Clear Lake, the Russian River was beheaded from Clear Lake by a slide (at Cow Mountain, east of Ukiah). Now Clear Lake flows into the Sacramento River. The river incised a canyon into Fitch Mountain at an early time, before land levels were eroded to their present levels. The Russian River was prevented from flowing south into San Pablo Bay, due to a 113-foot high ridge at Cotati. Guerneville is built on an abandoned meander of the river. Near Guerneville, another meander cut short Smith Creek.

The Mendocino Plateau is a part of the Franciscan Assemblage.

River modifications
A portion of the Eel River is diverted to headwaters of the Russian River in Potter Valley, via a scheme known as the Potter Valley Project. The Sonoma County Water Agency draws drinking water from the Russian River for sale to several hundred thousand residents of Sonoma, Mendocino, and northern Marin counties. Santa Rosa's Laguna Wastewater Treatment Plant treats sewage from several communities to tertiary standards and returns some of it to the river by way of the Laguna de Santa Rosa.

Water transferred from the Eel River and released from Lake Mendocino flows through the Russian River channel to withdrawal points in Sonoma County. Although this method of transport supports aquatic and riparian zone habitats, it is vulnerable to chemical contamination from transportation accidents where the river is in close proximity to highway 101 and Northwestern Pacific Railroad transportation corridors in locations like the canyon between Cloverdale and Hopland. This vulnerability was demonstrated in March 1982 when a tank car of formaldehyde was vandalized in Ukiah. Emergency response personnel were able to clean up approximately half of the  spilled, and a fortuitous combination of Lake Mendocino reservoir inventory and late winter storms helped flush the remainder through the river and into the ocean before local water storage inventories were exhausted.

Through effective use of Lake Mendocino and Lake Sonoma flood capacity the river has exceeded flood stage at Guerneville less frequently in the 21st century, but in late February 2019 it flooded to levels comparable to 1986.

Ecology

The river provides wildlife habitat including warm and cold freshwater habitat for fish migration and spawning. Historically it is interesting as one of two Northern California coastal rivers mentioned in the early nineteenth century by Russian explorer K. T. Khlebnikov as hosting sturgeon, presumably White sturgeon (Acipenser transmontanus), along with the Pajaro River. Khlebnikov stated in his "1820 Travel Notes", "Mr. Kuskov had sent two baidarkas to the Slavyanka River to catch sturgeon, and they returned today with ten fish...the largest one exceeding two arshins (4.67 feet) long". Moyle's Inland Fishes of California states that there were historic runs of white, but not green, sturgeon in the Russian River. White sturgeon are the largest freshwater fish in the United States.

The Russian River is the largest river in the Central California Coast Steelhead trout (Oncorhynchus mykiss) Distinct population segment. Natural waterfalls and the two major dams, Warm Springs (built in 1982) and Coyote (built in 1959), have isolated anadromous steelhead from its non-oceangoing rainbow trout form above the impassable barriers. Recent genetic studies on steelhead collected at 20 different sites both above and below passage barriers in the watershed found that despite the fact that 30 million hatchery trout were stocked in the river from 1911 to 1925, the steelhead remain of native and not hatchery stock.

Until recently, most reviews indicated that Chinook salmon (Oncorhynchus tshawytscha) were always scarce on the Russian River. However, in 2007, the Sonoma County Water Agency completed a comprehensive re-evaluation of historical records, coupled with a 5-year monitoring program using underwater cameras at two fish ladders just north of Forestville. They found that Chinook always were, and still are, "a relatively abundant, widely distributed, and naturally self-sustaining population". The authors found historic information dating to 1881 suggesting the presence of an ancestral population, and their genetic analysis found the Chinook both above and below barriers to fish passage to be of native, and not hatchery stock.

In 2001 the Coho salmon (Oncorhynchus kisutch) had dwindled to less than four returning spawners per year. These low numbers were the catalyst for the Russian River Coho Salmon Captive Broodstock Program, a recovery effort in which offspring from hatchery-reared adults are released into the river system. In 2011, biologists estimate that more than 190 adult coho may have returned to the Russian River watershed, beginning with early storms in October and peaking in December. High priority tributaries for restoration of stream flows and habitat for Coho include Dutch Bill, Grape, Green Valley, Mark West and Mill Creeks.

Similarly, early twentieth-century naturalists were skeptical that California Golden beaver (Castor canadensis subauratus) were extant in the coastal streams of the Bay Area. However, the Russian-American Company's Ivan Kuskov sailed into Bodega Bay in 1809 on the Kodiak and, after exploring 50 miles of the Russian River, returned to Novo Arkhangelsk, Alaska (Sitka), with beaver skins and over 2,000 sea otter (Enhydra lutris) pelts. The Russians' stated reason for establishing a settlement in Alta California was, "The rich, fertile soil [and] the abundance of seal, otter and beaver were the principal factors which favored this colonization." An 1816 report by the Russian-American Company's Board of Directors said that it was establishing a settlement to introduce agriculture.(page 33, After December 16, 1813: A report to Emperor Alexander I from the Russian American Company Council, concerning trade with California and the establishment of Fort Ross) Before establishing a southern colony at Fort Ross, the Russian-American Company contracted with American ships beginning in 1806, providing them with Aleuts and their baidarkas (kayaks) to hunt otter on the coast of Spanish California. Hudson's Bay Company's Alexander R. McLeod reported in 1829, "The Country to the northward of Bodega is said to be rich in Beaver and no encouragement given to the Indians to hunt." The fur trapper Ewing Young, led an expedition up Putah Creek to Clear Lake and on to the Mendocino County Coast in March, 1833. James Weeks, a member of Young's 1833 fur brigade wrote: "They broke up all the beaver lodges on the lake, I believe the finest and largest beaver we caught there, we arrived at the Russian River and pitched camp sent out, trappers found signs set traps caught beavers..." This historical observer record is consistent with the Southern Pomo, who inhabited the lower half of the Russian River, having a word for beaver ṱ’ek:e and beavers in their "Coyote Stories". In 1881 the Sacramento Daily Union newspaper reported, "Beavers are being trapped near Healdsburg" (placing them again on the Russian River).

The Russian River State Marine Reserve and Russian River State Marine Conservation Area protect the Russian River Estuary. Like underwater parks, these marine protected areas help conserve ocean and freshwater wildlife and marine ecosystems.

Russian River Valley

The river provides groundwater recharge and a water supply for agriculture. The river's floodplain includes many vineyards, and an area of the Russian River Valley was approved as an American Viticultural Area in 1983 and enlarged in 2006. It produces Chardonnay and Pinot noir wines in addition to other wine varietals, and is home to many small and several large commercial wineries.

See also
Bohemian Grove
Floods in California
List of rivers in California
List of watercourses in the San Francisco Bay Area
Russian River State Marine Reserve & Russian River State Marine Conservation Area
Sonoma County wine
Frog Woman Rock
California Wine Country
California Fur Rush
Monte Rio

References

External links

 Russian River Watersheds at Fish Friendly Farming
 Russian River Chamber of Commerce
 
 
 Google Street View Aug 2015

 
Rivers of Mendocino County, California
Rivers of Sonoma County, California
American Viticultural Areas of California
Rivers of Northern California